Nazmus Sadat (born October 18, 1986, in Khulna) is a Bangladeshi cricketer who has represented Bangladesh A and has played a Twenty20 International for his country. A left-handed batsman, he plays domestic cricket for Khulna Division.

See also
Cricinfo Profile

1986 births
Living people
Bangladeshi cricketers
Bangladesh Twenty20 International cricketers
Sylhet Division cricketers
Khulna Division cricketers
Sheikh Jamal Dhanmondi Club cricketers
Brothers Union cricketers
People from Khulna